"Love's Got a Hold on You" is a song written by Carson Chamberlain and Keith Stegall and performed by American country music artist Alan Jackson. It was released in July 1992 as the final single from Jackson's second album, Don't Rock the Jukebox. It was also the only song that Jackson did not co-write on the album, and the first single of such in his career. It peaked at number 1 on  both the U.S. Billboard country music chart, and on the Canadian RPM country music chart.

Content
The narrator is falling in love and doesn't know why he is acting differently. He asks the doctor and then his friends, they all say that it sounds like he is falling in love.

Critical reception
Deborah Evans Price, of Billboard magazine reviewed the song favorably, saying that "love has him in a lassoed condition." She goes on to say that Jackson's "rich vocal romping hooks this catchy twirl." The production was described as "big-sounding" and that it adds "just the right snap." Ben Foster of Country Universe gave the song an A grade," saying that "the light jaunty arrangement creates just the right mood for the silly lyrics, while Jackson’s laid-back delivery fits the song like a glove. The result is that Jackson creates an infectious singalong-friendly earworm out of a song that could have been a grating annoyance in the wrong hands."

Peak chart positions
"Love's Got a Hold on You" debuted at number 52 on the U.S. Billboard Hot Country Singles & Tracks for the week of July 25, 1992.

Year-end charts

References

1992 singles
Alan Jackson songs
Songs written by Keith Stegall
Songs written by Carson Chamberlain
Song recordings produced by Keith Stegall
Song recordings produced by Scott Hendricks
Arista Nashville singles
1991 songs